is a town located in Fukui Prefecture, Japan. ,  the town had an estimated population of 2,628 in 943 households and the population density of 14 persons per km².

Geography
Ikeda is located in the Imadate District, of central Fukui Prefecture, bordered by Gifu Prefecture to the south, Shiga Prefecture to the south and surrounded by mountains on all sides. Mount Kanmuri is the highest elevation at 1256 meters. The Asuwa River flows through the town. Ikeda consists mostly of narrow agricultural plains and small villages between steep, 1000–1500 m mountains in a main north-south valley and several branch valleys. The setting of the town, the old shrine in the town center, and a beautiful waterfall on the lower road to Ono are all local landmarks and are praised for their beauty, and occasionally attract tour buses from as far away as Osaka. Ikeda endures heavy snowfall in the winter, and access to neighboring towns, over mountain passes except to the north, can be difficult. The mountain roads leading east to Ono and south from Ikeda to Imajo and the especially dramatic road to Kinomoto in neighboring Shiga Prefecture are officially closed from November to May.

Neighbouring municipalities
Fukui Prefecture
Fukui
Echizen
Ōno
Echizen (town)
Sabae

Climate
Ikeda has a Humid climate (Köppen Cfa) characterized by warm, wet summers and cold winters with heavy snowfall.  The average annual temperature in Ikeda is 13.0 °C. The average annual rainfall is 2362 mm with September as the wettest month. The temperatures are highest on average in August, at around 25.7 °C, and lowest in January, at around 1.2 °C. Parts of the town are located within the extremely heavy snowfall area of Japan.

Demographics
Per Japanese census data, the population of Ikeda has declined by more than half over the past 50 years.

History
Ikeda is part of ancient Echizen Province. During the Edo period, the area was mostly part of the holdings of Sabae Domain  under the Tokugawa shogunate. Following the Meiji restoration, and the establishment of the modern municipalities it was organised into part of Imadate District in Fukui Prefecture.  Ikeda was formed on March 31, 1955 by the merger of the two former villages of Kami-Ikeda and Shimo-Ikeda.

Education
Ikeda has one public elementary schools and one middle school operated by the city government. The town has one public high school operated by the Fukui Prefectural Board of Education, which is scheduled to close in 2019.

Transportation

Railway
Ikeda has no public passenger railway service.

Highway

Local attractions
Ryūsō Falls, one of  "Japan’s Top 100 Waterfalls", 
Asuwagawa Dam

References

External links

 

 
Towns in Fukui Prefecture